Rt. Hon. Sir John Francis O'Neill Lentaigne CB (21 June 1803 – 12 November 1886) was an Irish administrator, lawyer and Privy Counsellor.

Life 
He was born 21 June 1803 in Tallaght, Dublin. His father was physician Dr. Benjamin Lentaigne of Dominick Street, Dublin, an immigrant from France. His mother was Marie Thérèse O'Neill, daughter of John O'Neill. He was one of the first pupils to attend school at Clongowes Wood College. He graduated from Trinity College and with a medical degree.

He was a Privy Counsellor for Ireland from 1886. He served as a Justice of the Peace and Deputy Lieutenant for County Monaghan and was appointed High Sheriff of Monaghan for 1844–45. He became a member of the Prisons Board and was Inspector-General of Prisons in Ireland from 1854 to 1877 and Commissioner of National Education. He was president of the Statistical and Social Inquiry Society of Ireland between 1877 and 1878 and president of the Royal Zoological Society of Ireland.

He was invested as a Companion of the Order of the Bath and made a Knight of the Order of Pius IX.

On his death in 1886 he was buried at Glasnevin Cemetery, Dublin. He had married Mary, the daughter and co-heiress of Francis Magan of Emoe, Westmeath, with whom he had 12 children. One son, John Vincent Lentaigne, also became a doctor.

Arms

References

 
 Irish Industrial Schools by Jane Barnes 1989 p51

External links
 

1803 births
1886 deaths
People educated at Clongowes Wood College
19th-century Irish lawyers
Members of the Privy Council of Ireland
Burials at Glasnevin Cemetery
Companions of the Order of the Bath
High Sheriffs of Monaghan
Deputy Lieutenants of Monaghan
Statistical and Social Inquiry Society of Ireland
John
Zoological Society of Ireland